The Gate may refer to:

Places
 The Gate (California), a mountain gap in Siskiyou County, California, United States.
 The Gate (Gunnison County, Colorado), a canyon narrows in Gunnison County, Colorado, United States.
 The Gate (Saguache County, Colorado), a canyon narrows in Saguache County, Colorado, United States.
 The Gate, Newcastle, an entertainment venue in Newcastle upon Tyne, England
 The Gate Arts Centre, Cardiff, Wales
 The Gate Shams Abu Dhabi, a development project in Abu Dhabi

Literature
 The Gate (novel), a 1910 novel by Japanese author Natsume Sōseki
 The Gate (autobiography), a 2003 autobiography by French writer François Bizot

Film
 The Gate (1987 film), a 1987 Canadian horror film
 The Gate (2014 film), a 2014 French film

Music
 The Gate (Kurt Elling album), a 2011 album by Kurt Elling
 The Gate (Swans album), a 2015 album by Swans
 "The Gate" (song), a 2017 song by Björk
 "The Gate", a song by Sam Roberts on the album Chemical City
 "The Gate", a track on the album Light & Shade by Mike Oldfield

Other uses
 TheGATE.ca, a Canadian entertainment website
 The Gates, an art installation by Christo and Jeanne-Claude in Central Park in New York City
 The Gates (TV series), a 2010 American supernatural crime drama television series on ABC
 The Báb (1819–1850), which means the "Gate" and is the title taken by the founder of Bábism
 Margate F.C., an English football club, nicknamed 'The Gate'

See also

 Gates (disambiguation)
 Gate (disambiguation)